Clifford or Cliff Wright may refer to:

Clifford
 Clifford Wright (bishop) (1922–2014), Anglican bishop of Monmouth
 Clifford Wright (mayor) (1927–2014), mayor of Saskatoon, Canada

Cliff
 Cliff Wright (illustrator) (born 1963), British artist and illustrator
 Cliff Wright (fighter) (born 1979), American mixed martial artist
 Cliff Wright (footballer) (born 1944), English footballer